Palaivana Solai is a 2009 Indian Tamil language film starring Nithin Sathya and Karthika Mathew. It is a remake of the 1980 film with the same name. The film received negative reviews from critics and failed to replicate the success of original film.

Plot
Ramana (Sanjeev), Yuvan (Abhinay), Aadhi (Sathyan), Prabhu (Nithin Sathya) and Iniyan (Chams) are friends in a locality. Yuvan is a spoilt-brat and is the son of a rich entrepreneur. Ramana is a caring brother who is determined to work hard and get his sisters married. Iniyan (Chams) is a struggling lawyer and Aadhi wants to make it big in cinema. Prabhu is a happy-go-lucky youth, who runs an auto rickshaw.

Their life takes a turn when Priya (Karthika) arrives in their locality. Priya gets acquainted with them. She helps them overcome their inferiority complex and succeed in their careers. Meanwhile, Aadhi develops romance towards her. But the friends suffer a shock when they come to know that Priya is on the brink of death and is affected by heart problems.

Cast
Nithin Sathya as Prabhu
Karthika Mathew as Priya
Sanjeev as Ramana
Abhinay as Yuvan
Sathyan as Aadhi
Chaams as Iniyan

Soundtrack
Music was composed by Bobby and lyrics were by Vairamuthu.
"Pournami" - SPB
"Engal Kadhai" - SPB
"Aalanalum" - Karthik
"Megame" - Sadhana Sargam
"Happy New" - Benny Dayal
"Chikkan" - Shankar Mahadevan

Critical reception
Times of India wrote "It is well presented but the film still falls short of expectations. In an era of short texts and fast communication, it is a bit out of synch." Behindwoods wrote "Although it largely sticks to the plot of its predecessor and remains loyal to the original, the movie falters to adapt itself to the current state of affairs. After all, in today's world of speed dating, a dying heroine who hooks up the hero with another girl hardly makes for good viewing."

References

External links 

 

2009 films
2000s Tamil-language films
Remakes of Indian films